Castle Vale Shopping Centre (also known as Castle Vale Retail Park) is a retail park located on the Castle Vale estate in Birmingham, England.  It is situated off the A452 Chester Road and was originally built in the 1970s.

The original centre was built in 1970 to serve the new housing estate that was being developed at this time. It was initially very popular thanks to its wide range of shops and modern, functional design. But it was one of the most hard-hit parts of the estate during the decline that began towards the end of the 1970s. Shoplifting and vandalism became rife, traders moved out.  By 1994, 30% of the units in the centre were vacant.

Castle Vale Shopping Centre was completely rebuilt as a modern retail park during the early 2000s, at a cost of £35million.  The first store to open in the new development was Sainsbury's, opened in 2000.  Other major stores opened on the site are Argos, Comet (The Comet unit has been let out to B&M), T.K. Maxx, Smyths, SCS, William Hill and a Lloyds Pharmacy as well as a number of smaller units including a post office.

In 2007 the retail park was sold by its owners British Land to PRUPIM for £90million.

References

External links
 Redevelopment of the Castle Vale Shopping Centre: Post Implementation Review
 Castle Vale Retail Park on CompletelyRetail

Shopping centres in the West Midlands (county)
Buildings and structures in Birmingham, West Midlands
Retail parks in the United Kingdom
Shopping malls established in 1970